A stone tool is, in the most general sense, any tool made either partially or entirely out of stone. Although stone tool-dependent societies and cultures still exist today, most stone tools are associated with prehistoric (particularly Stone Age) cultures that have become extinct. Archaeologists often study such prehistoric societies, and refer to the study of stone tools as lithic analysis. Ethnoarchaeology has been a valuable research field in order to further the understanding and cultural implications of stone tool use and manufacture.

Stone has been used to make a wide variety of different tools throughout history, including arrowheads, spearheads, hand axes, and querns. Stone tools may be made of either ground stone or knapped stone, the latter fashioned by a flintknapper.
 
Knapped stone tools are made from cryptocrystalline materials such as chert or flint, radiolarite, chalcedony, obsidian, basalt, and  quartzite via a process known as lithic reduction. One simple form of reduction is to strike stone flakes from a nucleus (core) of material using a hammerstone or similar hard hammer fabricator. If the goal of the reduction strategy is to produce flakes, the remnant lithic core may be discarded once it has become too small to use. In some strategies, however, a flintknapper reduces the core to a rough unifacial, or bifacial preform, which is further reduced using soft hammer flaking techniques or by pressure flaking the edges.

More complex forms of reduction include the production of highly standardized blades, which can then be fashioned into a variety of tools such as scrapers, knives, sickles, and microliths. In general terms, Knapped stone tools are nearly ubiquitous in all pre-metal-using societies because they are easily manufactured, the tool stone is usually plentiful, and they are easy to transport and sharpen.

Evolution

Archaeologists classify stone tools into industries (also known as complexes or technocomplexes) that share distinctive technological or morphological characteristics.

In 1969 in the 2nd edition of World Prehistory, Grahame Clark proposed an evolutionary progression of flint-knapping in which the "dominant lithic technologies" occurred in a fixed sequence from Mode 1 through Mode 5. He assigned to them relative dates: Modes 1 and 2 to the Lower Palaeolithic, 3 to the Middle Palaeolithic, 4 to the Upper Paleolithic, and 5 to the Mesolithic, though there were other lithic technologies outside these Modes. Each region had its own timeline for the succession of the Modes: for example, Mode 1 was in use in Europe long after it had been replaced by Mode 2 in Africa.

Clark's scheme was adopted enthusiastically by the archaeological community. One of its advantages was the simplicity of terminology; for example, the Mode 1 / Mode 2 Transition. The transitions are currently of greatest interest. Consequently, in the literature the stone tools used in the period of the Palaeolithic are divided into four "modes", each of which designates a different form of complexity, and which in most cases followed a rough chronological order.

Pre-Mode I
Kenya
Stone tools found from 2011 to 2014 at the Lomekwi archeology site near Lake Turkana in Kenya, are dated to be 3.3 million years old, and predate the genus Homo by about one million years. The oldest known Homo fossil is about 2.4-2.3 million years old compared to the 3.3 million year old stone tools.  The stone tools may have been made by Australopithecus afarensis, the species whose best fossil example is Lucy, which inhabited East Africa at the same time as the date of the oldest stone tools, a yet unidentified species, or by Kenyanthropus platyops (a 3.2 to 3.5-million-year-old Pliocene hominin fossil discovered in 1999). Dating of the tools was by dating volcanic ash layers in which the tools were found and dating the magnetic signature (pointing north or south due to reversal of the magnetic poles)  of the rock at the site.

Ethiopia
Grooved, cut and fractured animal bone fossils, made by using stone tools, were found in Dikika, Ethiopia near (200 yards) the remains of Selam, a young Australopithecus afarensis girl who lived about 3.3 million years ago.

Mode I: The Oldowan Industry

The earliest stone tools in the era of genus Homo are Mode 1 tools, and come from what has been termed the Oldowan Industry, named after the type of site (many sites, actually) found in Olduvai Gorge, Tanzania, where they were discovered in large quantities. Oldowan tools were characterised by their simple construction, predominantly using core forms. These cores were river pebbles, or rocks similar to them, that had been struck by a spherical hammerstone to cause conchoidal fractures removing flakes from one surface, creating an edge and often a sharp tip. The blunt end is the proximal surface; the sharp, the distal. Oldowan is a percussion technology. Grasping the proximal surface, the hominid brought the distal surface down hard on an object he wished to detach or shatter, such as a bone or tuber. Experiments with modern humans found that all four Oldowan knapping techniques can be invented by knapping-naive participants, and that the resulting Oldowan tools were used by the experiment participants to access a money-baited box. 

The earliest known Oldowan tools yet found date from 2.6 million years ago, during the Lower Palaeolithic period, and have been uncovered at Gona in Ethiopia. After this date, the Oldowan Industry subsequently spread throughout much of Africa, although archaeologists are currently unsure which Hominan species first developed them, with some speculating that it was Australopithecus garhi, and others believing that it was in fact Homo habilis. Homo habilis was the hominin who used the tools for most of the Oldowan in Africa, but at about 1.9-1.8 million years ago Homo erectus inherited them. The Industry flourished in southern and eastern Africa between 2.6 and 1.7 million years ago, but was also spread out of Africa and into Eurasia by travelling bands of H. erectus, who took it as far east as Java by 1.8 million years ago and Northern China by 1.6 million years ago.

Mode II: The Acheulean Industry

Eventually, more complex Mode 2 tools began to be developed through the Acheulean Industry, named after the site of Saint-Acheul in France. The Acheulean was characterised not by the core, but by the biface, the most notable form of which was the hand axe. The Acheulean first appears in the archaeological record as early as 1.7 million years ago in the West Turkana area of Kenya and contemporaneously in southern Africa.

The Leakeys, excavators at Olduvai, defined a "Developed Oldowan" Period in which they believed they saw evidence of an overlap in Oldowan and Acheulean. In their species-specific view of the two industries, Oldowan equated to H. habilis and Acheulean to H. erectus. Developed Oldowan was assigned to habilis and Acheulean to erectus. Subsequent dates on H. erectus pushed the fossils back to well before Acheulean tools; that is, H. erectus must have initially used Mode 1. There was no reason to think, therefore, that Developed Oldowan had to be habilis; it could have been erectus. Opponents of the view divide Developed Oldowan between Oldowan and Acheulean. There is no question, however, that habilis and erectus coexisted, as habilis fossils are found as late as 1.4 million years ago. Meanwhile, African H. erectus developed Mode 2. In any case a wave of Mode 2 then spread across Eurasia, resulting in use of both there. H. erectus may not have been the only hominin to leave Africa; European fossils are sometimes associated with Homo ergaster, a contemporary of H. erectus in Africa.

In contrast to an Oldowan tool, which is the result of a fortuitous and probably ex tempore operation to obtain one sharp edge on a stone, an Acheulean tool is a planned result of a manufacturing process. The manufacturer begins with a blank, either a larger stone or a slab knocked off a larger rock. From this blank he or she removes large flakes, to be used as cores. Standing a core on edge on an anvil stone, he or she hits the exposed edge with centripetal blows of a hard hammer to roughly shape the implement. Then the piece must be worked over again, or retouched, with a soft hammer of wood or bone to produce a tool finely Knapped all over consisting of two convex surfaces intersecting in a sharp edge. Such a tool is used for slicing; concussion would destroy the edge and cut the hand.

Some Mode 2 tools are disk-shaped, others ovoid, others leaf-shaped and pointed, and others elongated and pointed at the distal end, with a blunt surface at the proximal end, obviously used for drilling. Mode 2 tools are used for butchering; not being composite (having no haft) they are not very appropriate killing instruments. The killing must have been done some other way. Mode 2 tools are larger than Oldowan. The blank was ported to serve as an ongoing source of flakes until it was finally retouched as a finished tool itself. Edges were often sharpened by further retouching.

Mode III: The Mousterian Industry

Eventually, the Acheulean in Europe was replaced by a lithic technology known as the Mousterian Industry, which was named after the site of Le Moustier in France, where examples were first uncovered in the 1860s. Evolving from the Acheulean, it adopted the Levallois technique to produce smaller and sharper knife-like tools as well as scrapers. Also known as the "prepared core technique", flakes are struck from worked cores and then subsequently retouched. The Mousterian Industry was developed and used primarily by the Neanderthals, a native European and Middle Eastern hominin species, but a broadly similar industry is contemporaneously widespread in Africa.

Mode IV: The Aurignacian Industry
The widespread use of long blades (rather than flakes) of the Upper Palaeolithic Mode 4 industries appeared during the Upper Palaeolithic between 50,000 and 10,000 years ago, although blades were produced in small quantities much earlier by Neanderthals. The Aurignacian culture seems to have been the first to rely largely on blades. The use of blades exponentially increases the efficiency of core usage compared to the Levallois flake technique, which had a similar advantage over Acheulean technology which was worked from cores.

Mode V: The Microlithic Industries

Mode 5 stone tools involve the production of microliths, which were used in composite tools, mainly fastened to a shaft. Examples include the Magdalenian culture. Such a technology makes much more efficient use of available materials like flint, although required greater skill in manufacturing the small flakes. Mounting sharp flint edges in a wood or bone handle is the key innovation in microliths, essentially because the handle gives the user protection against the flint and also improves leverage of the device.

Neolithic industries

In prehistoric Japan, ground stone tools appear during the Japanese Paleolithic period, that lasted from around 40,000 BC to 14,000 BC.  Elsewhere, ground stone tools became important during the Neolithic period beginning about 10,000 BC. These ground or polished implements are manufactured from larger-grained materials such as basalt, jade and jadeite, greenstone and some forms of rhyolite which are not suitable for flaking. The greenstone industry was important in the English Lake District, and is known as the Langdale axe industry. Ground stone implements included adzes, celts, and axes, which were manufactured using a labour-intensive, time-consuming method of repeated grinding against an abrasive stone, often using water as a lubricant. Because of their coarse surfaces, some ground stone tools were used for grinding plant foods and were polished not just by intentional shaping, but also by use. Manos are hand stones used in conjunction with metates for grinding corn or grain. Polishing increased the intrinsic mechanical strength of the axe. Polished stone axes were important for the widespread clearance of woods and forest during the Neolithic period, when crop and livestock farming developed on a large scale. They are distributed very widely and were traded over great distances since the best rock types were often very local. They also became venerated objects, and were frequently buried in long barrows or round barrows with their former owners.

During the Neolithic period, large axes were made from flint nodules by knapping a rough shape, a so-called "rough-out". Such products were traded across a wide area. The rough-outs were then polished to give the surface a fine finish to create the axe head. Polishing not only increased the final strength of the product but also meant that the head could penetrate wood more easily.

There were many sources of supply, including Grimes Graves in Suffolk, Cissbury in Sussex and Spiennes near Mons in Belgium to mention but a few. In Britain, there were numerous small quarries in downland areas where flint was removed for local use, for example.

Many other rocks were used to make axes from stones, including the Langdale axe industry as well as numerous other sites such as Penmaenmawr and Tievebulliagh in Co Antrim, Ulster. In Langdale, there many outcrops of the greenstone were exploited, and knapped where the stone was extracted. The sites exhibit piles of waste flakes, as well as rejected rough-outs. Polishing improved the mechanical strength of the tools, so increasing their life and effectiveness. Many other tools were developed using the same techniques. Such products were traded across the country and abroad.

Aboriginal Australian use

Stone axes from 35,000 years ago are the earliest known use of a stone tool in Australia. Other stone tools varied in type and use among various Aboriginal Australian peoples, dependent on geographical regions and the type and structure of the tools varied among the different cultural and linguistic groups. The locations of the various artefacts, as well as whole geologic features, demarcated territorial and cultural boundaries of various linguistic and cultural groups' lands. They developed trade networks, and showed sophistication in working many different types of stone for many different uses, including as tools, food utensils and weapons, and modified their stone tools over the millennia to adapt to changing environments. Oral traditions carried the skills down through the ages.

Complex stone tools were used by the Gunditjmara of western Victoria until relatively recently. Many examples are now held in museums.

Flaked stone tools were made by extracting a sharp fragment of stone from a larger piece, called a core, by hitting it with a "hammerstone". Both the flakes and the hammerstones could be used as tools. The best types of stone for these tools are hard, brittle stones, rich in silica, such as quartzite, chert, flint, silcrete and quartz (the latter particularly in the Kimberleys of Western Australia). These were quarried from bedrock or collected as pebbles from watercourses and beaches, and often carried for long distances. The flake could be used immediately for cutting or scraping, but were sometimes modified in a process called reduction to sharpen or resharpen the flake.

Tasmania did not have spears or stone axes, but the peoples there used tools which were adapted to the climate and environment, such as the use of spongolite. In north-western Australia, "Kimberley point", a small triangular stone point, was created using kangaroo bone which had been shaped with stone into an awl, to make small serrations in the blade.

Apart from being used as weapons and for cutting, grinding (grindstones), piercing and pounding, some stones, notably ochres, were used as pigment for painting.

Modern uses
Stone tools are still one of the most successful technologies used by humans.

The invention of the flintlock gun mechanism in the sixteenth century produced a demand for specially shaped gunflints.  The gunflint industry survived until the middle of the twentieth century in some places, including in the English town of Brandon.

Threshing boards with lithic flakes are used in agriculture from Neolithic, and are still used today in the regions where agriculture has not been mechanized and industrialized.

Glassy stones (flint, quartz, jasper, agate) were used with a variety of iron pyrite or marcasite stones as percussion fire starter tools. That was the most common method of producing fire in pre-industrial societies. Stones were later superseded by use of steel, ferrocerium and matches.

For specialist purposes glass knives are still made and used today, particularly for cutting thin sections for electron microscopy in a technique known as microtomy. Freshly cut blades are always used since the sharpness of the edge is very great. These knives are made from high-quality manufactured glass, however, not from natural raw materials such as chert or obsidian. Surgical knives made from obsidian are still used in some delicate surgeries, as they cause less damage to tissues than surgical knives and the resulting wounds heal more quickly. In 1975, American archaeologist Don Crabtree manufactured  obsidian scalpels which were used for surgery on his own body.

Tool stone 

In archaeology, a tool stone is a type of stone that is used to manufacture stone tools.

See also

Chaîne opératoire
Eccentric flint (archaeology)
Flint
Knapping
Langdale axe industry
Lithic technology
Manuport
Mount William stone axe quarry
Prismatic blade

References

External links

 
 
 
 
 
 
 
 
 
 
 
 
 

 
Tools
Archaeological artefact types
Primitive technology
Stone objects